This is a list of schools in Tuen Mun District, Hong Kong.

Secondary schools

 Government
  (南屯門官立中學)
 Tuen Mun Government Secondary School

 Aided
  (浸信會永隆中學)
  (佛教沈香林紀念中學)
  (明愛屯門馬登基金中學)
  (中華基督教會何福堂書院)
 CCC Tam Lee Lai Fun Memorial Secondary School
  (青松侯寶垣中學)
  (宣道中學)
  (香港九龍塘基督教中華宣道會陳瑞芝紀念中學)
  (廠商會蔡章閣中學)
  (鐘聲慈善社胡陳金枝中學)
  (香海正覺蓮社佛教梁植偉中學)
  (sponsored by Sik Sik Yuen) (嗇色園主辦可藝中學)
  (裘錦秋中學﹝屯門﹞)
 Lui Cheung Kwong Lutheran College (路德會呂祥光中學)
  (妙法寺劉金龍中學)
  (新生命教育協會平安福音中學)
  (加拿大神召會嘉智中學)
  (保良局百周年李兆忠紀念中學)
 PLK Tang Yuk Tien College
  (新會商會中學)
  (深培中學)
  (聖公會聖西門呂明才中學)
  (馬錦明慈善基金馬可賓紀念中學)
 STFA Leung Kau Kui College
  (順德聯誼總會譚伯羽中學)
  (崇真書院)
 Tuen Mun Catholic Secondary School
  (東華三院辛亥年總理中學)
 TWGH Yau Tze Tin Memorial College
  (東華三院鄺錫坤伉儷中學)
  (仁濟醫院第二中學)
  (仁愛堂田家炳中學)
  (仁愛堂陳黃淑芳紀念中學)
  (恩平工商會李琳明中學)

 Private
 Harrow International School Hong Kong

Primary schools

 Government
 Tuen Mun Government Primary School (屯門官立小學)

 Aided
 AD& FD of Pok Oi Hospital Mrs Cheng Yam On Millennium School (博愛醫院歷屆總理聯誼會鄭任安夫人千禧小學)
 AD& FD of Pok Oi Hospital Mrs Cheng Yam On School (博愛醫院歷屆總理聯誼會鄭任安夫人學校)
 Castle Peak Catholic Primary School (青山天主教小學)
 CCC But San Primary School (中華基督教會拔臣小學)
 CCC Hoh Fuk Tong Primary School (中華基督教會何福堂小學)
 CCC Mong Wong Far Yok Memorial Primary School (中華基督教會蒙黃花沃紀念小學)
 FDBWA Chow Chin Yau School (五邑鄒振猷學校)
 HK Eng Clansman Association Wu Si Chong Memorial School (僑港伍氏宗親會伍時暢紀念學校)
 HKRSS Tuen Mun Primary School (香港紅卍字會屯門卍慈小學)
 Islamic Primary School (伊斯蘭學校)
 LKWFS Lau Tak Yung Memorial Primary School (世界龍岡學校劉德容紀念小學)
 Lok Sin Tong Leung Wong Wai Fong Memorial School (樂善堂梁黃蕙芳紀念學校)
 Lui Cheung Kwong Lutheran Primary School (路德會呂祥光小學)
 Lutheran Tsang Shing Siu Leun School (香港路德會增城兆霖學校)
 PLK Fong Wong Kam Chuen Primary School (保良局方王錦全小學)
 PLK Horizon East Primary School (保良局志豪小學)
 PLK Leung Chow Shun Kam Primary School (保良局梁周順琴小學)
 PLK Vicwood KT Chong No. 2 Primary School (保良局莊啓程第二小學)
 PLK WWCWD Fung Lee Pui Yiu Primary School (保良局西區婦女福利會馮李佩瑤小學)
 SKH Mung Yan Primary School (聖公會蒙恩小學)
 SRBCEPSA Ho Sau Ki School (柏立基教育學院校友會何壽基學校)
 STFA Ho Yat Tung Primary School (順德聯誼總會何日東小學)
 STFA Lee Kam Primary School (順德聯誼總會李金小學)
 STFA Wu Siu Kui Memorial Primary School (順德聯誼總會胡少渠紀念小學)
 Taoist Ching Chung Primary School (Wu King Estate) (道教青松小學（湖景邨）)
 Taoist Ching Chung Primary School (道教青松小學)
 Toi Shan Association Primary School (台山商會學校)
 TWGH Tang Shiu Kin Primary School (東華三院鄧肇堅小學)
 TYYI Chan Kwok Chiu Hing Tak Primary School (圓玄學院陳國超興德小學)
 Yan Oi Tong Madam Lau Wong Fat Primary School (仁愛堂劉皇發夫人小學)
 Yan Tak Catholic Primary School (仁德天主教小學)
 YCH Ho Sik Nam Primary School (仁濟醫院何式南小學)
 YCH Law Chan Shor Si Primary School (仁濟醫院羅陳楚思小學)

 Direct Subsidy Scheme
 Po Leung Kuk Hong Kong Taoist Association Yuen Yuen Primary School (保良局香港道教聯合會圓玄小學)

 Private
 Harrow International School Hong Kong
 R.T.C. Gaia School (鄉師自然學校)

Special schools

 Aided
 Hong Chi Morninglight School, Tuen Mun (匡智屯門晨曦學校)
 Hong Chi Morninghill School, Tuen Mun (匡智屯門晨崗學校)
 Hong Chi Morninghope School, Tuen Mun (匡智屯門晨輝學校)
 Hong Kong Christian Service Pui Oi School (香港基督教服務處培愛學校)
 Hong Kong Red Cross Hospital Schools Castle Peak Hospital (香港紅十字會醫院學校)
 Hong Kong Red Cross Hospital Schools Tuen Mun Hospital (香港紅十字會醫院學校)
 Tung Wan Mok Law Shui Wah School (東灣莫羅瑞華學校)

References

Lists of schools in Hong Kong
Tuen Mun District